The men's 800 metres event at the 2015 Military World Games was held on 4 and 5 and 6 October at the KAFAC Sports Complex.

Records
Prior to this competition, the existing world and CISM record were as follows:

Schedule

Medalists

Results

Round 1
Qualification: First 3 in each heat (Q) and next 4 fastest (q) qualified for the semifinals.

Semifinals
Qualification: First 3 in each heat (Q) and next 2 fastest (q) qualified for the final.

Final

References

800